Arnor Angeli (born 25 February 1991) is a Belgian footballer who plays in midfield for Renaissance Mons 44.

Early life 
Angeli is from Brussels, and his father, a supporter of Sporting d'Anderlecht, named him after Arnór Guðjohnsen, the Icelandic attacker for the Anderlecht team in the 1980s.

Club career 

Angeli was trained at Anderlecht. He played there from the age of six, for the under sevens until the under 15s. ans. When a coach from Lierse SK signed some other players, Angeli decided, with regret, to leave Anderlecht to play more games. He then played for Brussels, but when they were relegated to D2 and he no longer had the opportunity to play for an elite team, he decided to leave the club. With the option of a number of Belgian, Dutch, and French clubs, he decided to join Standard de Liège due to its proximity to sporting projects. Aged 18, he signed a contract with the club. He played for the U19s at first, quickly rising to the reserves (U21). For the following season (2009–2010), he was named in the first team.

Angeli played his first game in Belgian First Division A in the 95th minute of the Standard-Courtrai match on 26 September 2009. The score was 1–0 and Standard needed an equaliser in the dying seconds. After only 65 seconds of play, with his second touch of the ball, Angeli scored a goal which sealed the victory. He was named as a starter in his first game in the same season, in the game against Mouscron (0–0) on 30 October 2009.

International career 
Angeli plays for the youth national teams. He took part in the U19 Belgium team which competed in a friendly tournament.

Honours
 Standard Liège
 Belgian Super Cup: 2009

References

External links
 
 
 

Living people
1991 births
Belgian footballers
Belgian expatriate footballers
Belgium under-21 international footballers
Belgium youth international footballers
R.S.C. Anderlecht players
Standard Liège players
Beerschot A.C. players
R.A.E.C. Mons players
U.S. Avellino 1912 players
F.C.V. Dender E.H. players
Léopold FC players
UR La Louvière Centre players
Belgian Pro League players
Serie B players
Footballers from Brussels
Association football midfielders
Belgian expatriate sportspeople in Italy
Expatriate footballers in Italy